Akoniodes is a monotypic moth genus of the family Noctuidae. Its only species, Akoniodes kuyanianus, is found in Taiwan. Both the genus and species were first described by Shōnen Matsumura in 1929.

References

Acronictinae
Noctuoidea genera
Monotypic moth genera
Taxa named by Shōnen Matsumura